Halime Hatice Hatun was a Turkish princess, the daughter of İsfendiyar Bey, eighth ruler of the Isfendiyarids. She was the consort of Sultan Murad II of the Ottoman Empire.

First marriage
Sultan Murad II married Halime Hatun around 1425, at Edirne, giving in marriage two of his sisters, Selçuk Hatun and Sultan Hatun to Halime Hatun's brothers, Ibrahim Bey and Kasım Bey. By this dynastic union, Murad established an alliance with a powerful tribe against his most formidable enemy in Anatolia, the Karamanid Türkmen, who blocked the expansion of the Ottomans to the east. The good relations were preserved during the reign of the next sultan Mehmed II who endowed members of the dynasty with mülks in the region of Plovdiv and Didymoteicho, later transformed into waqfs. 

In 1435 Murad married Mara Branković. In the beginning Mara was warmly accepted, and Halime Hatun who was the Sultan's favourite wife, was expelled from the court and sent to Bursa. It seems that something occurred at the Ottoman Porte between the autumn of 1435 and spring of 1436. It was during this time that Mara fell out of favour and was exiled while Halime Hatun once again returned.

In 1450, Halime Hatun gave birth to a son named Hasan Çelebi. Thus Mehmed now had a half-brother younger than his own sons, who would be a possible rival for the throne.

Second marriage
Murad died in 1451, and his son Mehmed the Conqueror ascended the throne. Directly after his coronation, he went to the harem of Edirne Palace, where he received the congratulations of all the women there, who also gave him their condolences on the death of his father. The highest-ranking of the decreased sultan's wives at the time of his death was Halime Hatun, who fifteen months before had given birth to Murad's last son, Hasan. Succession had often been a matter of contention in the Ottoman dynasty and had led two civil wars. So Mehmed decided that in this case, he would settle the matter at once by ordering the execution of Küçük Ahmed. Halime Hatun was in the throne room imparting to the new Sultan her grief at the loss of her husband, Mehmed dispatched Ali Bey, the son of Gazi Evrenos to the Women's quarters to drown the baby. Mehmed justified the murder of his half-brother as being accordance with the Ottoman code of fratricide, which on several occasions had been practised by his ancestors to prevent wars of succession. Mehmed later obliged Ishak Pasha, one of his father's officials and the new beylerbeyi of Anatolia, to take Halime Hatun as his wife.

The two together had eight children, five sons named Halil Bey, Şadi Bey, Mustafa Çelebi, Piri Çelebi, and Ibrahim Bey, and three daughters named Hafsa Hatun, Fahrünnisa Hatun, and Şehzade Hatun.

References

Sources

 

15th-century consorts of Ottoman sultans
Princesses

People from Devrekani
1410s births
1500s deaths